Flowers from the Moon and Other Lunacies is a collection of horror and fantasy stories by American writer Robert Bloch.  It was released in 1998 and was the author's third book published by Arkham House.  It was published in an edition of 2,565 copies.  The stories, selected by Robert M. Price, originally appeared in the magazines Weird Tales, Strange Stories, and Rogue.  The collection includes some Cthulhu Mythos stories.

Contents

Flowers from the Moon and Other Lunacies contains the following tales:

 "Introduction", by Robert M. Price
 "The Druidic Doom"
 "Fangs of Vengeance"
 "Death is An Elephant"
 "A Question of Identity"
 "Death Has Five Guesses"
 "The Bottomless Pool"
 "The Dark Isle"
 "Flowers From the Moon"
 "He Waits Beneath the Sea"
 "Power of Druid"
 "Be Yourself"
 "A Sorcerer Runs for Sheriff"
 "Black Bargain"
 "A Bottle of Gin"
 "Wine of Sabbat"
 "Soul Proprietor"
 "Satan’s Phonograph"
 "The Man Who Told The Truth"
 "The Night They Crashed the Party"
 "Philtre Tip"

Sources

1998 short story collections
Fantasy short story collections
Horror short story collections
Cthulhu Mythos anthologies
Arkham House books
Short story collections by Robert Bloch